The Time and the Place is an album by Art Farmer's Quintet recorded in 1967 and originally released on the Columbia label. Although originally promoted as a live album the tracks were actually recorded in the studio and audience overdubbed.  In 2007, Mosaic Records released the original live set from the original three-track recordings as the title The Time and the Place: The Lost Concert.

Reception

Ken Dryden of Allmusic states, "Although the overly enthusiastic audience tends at times to applaud prematurely and a bit too loudly, the music is first-rate".

Track listing
 "The Time and the Place" (Jimmy Heath) - 4:30	
 "The Shadow of Your Smile" (Johnny Mandel, Paul Francis Webster) - 7:10	
 "One for Juan" (Heath) - 8:56	
 "Nino's Scene" (Art Farmer) - 5:53	
 "Short Cake" (J.J. Johnson) - 5:26	
 "Make Someone Happy" (Betty Comden, Adolph Green, Jule Styne) - 6:57	
 "On the Trail" (Ferde Grofé) - 2:31

Personnel
Art Farmer - flugelhorn
Jimmy Heath - tenor saxophone
Cedar Walton - piano
Walter Booker - bass
Mickey Roker - drums

References 

Columbia Records albums
Art Farmer albums
1967 albums
Albums produced by Teo Macero